Pars El-Goli Hotel is a five star hotel with 179 rooms located near the El-Goli in Tabriz, East Azerbaijan, Iran. The hotel opened in 2002 as the Pars Hotels investment company.

References 

 
 

Hotel buildings completed in 2002
Hotels in Iran
Buildings and structures in Tabriz
Buildings and structures with revolving restaurants
Towers in Iran